The 2009–10 South Pacific cyclone season began on December 3, 2009 with the formation of Tropical Disturbance 01F, 32 days after the cyclone season had officially begun on November 1, 2009. The season ended on April 30, 2010. These dates conventionally delimit the period of each year when most tropical cyclones form in the southern Pacific Ocean east of 160°E. Additionally, the regional tropical cyclone operational plan defines a tropical cyclone year separately from a tropical cyclone season; the "tropical cyclone year" began on July 1, 2009 and ended on June 30, 2010. Tropical cyclones between 160°E and 120°W and north of 25°S are monitored by the Fiji Meteorological Service. Those that move south of 25°S are monitored by the Tropical Cyclone Warning Centre in Wellington, New Zealand. The first tropical disturbance of the season formed on December 3, about 1015 km (700 mi) to the north of Suva, Fiji and later intensified into Tropical Cyclone Mick. The last system, 15F, dissipated on April 5 of the following year.


Seasonal outlooks 

Ahead of the cyclone season, RSMC Nadi, TCWC Wellington, the Australian Bureau of Meteorology (BoM), the New Zealand National Institute of Water and Atmospheric Research (NIWA) and various other Pacific Meteorological services, all contributed towards the Island Climate Update tropical cyclone outlook that was released during October 2009. The outlook took into account the El Niño conditions and normal developments during a near-normal season. The outlook called for a near average number of tropical cyclones for the 2009–10 season, with eight to eleven tropical cyclones, to occur between 135°E and 120°W compared to an average of about nine. At least two of the tropical cyclones were expected to become category 3 severe tropical cyclones, while one was likely to become a category 4 severe tropical cyclone. The outlook also noted that it was likely that the first storm would develop prior to the end of December. During February 2010, a seasonal forecast update was issued which maintained the original forecast of eight to eleven named tropical cyclones. In addition to contributing towards the Island Climate Update outlooks, RSMC Nadi issued their own seasonal forecast for their area of responsibility. Within their outlook RSMC Nadi predicted that between eight and eleven tropical cyclones, would occur within the basin compared to an average of around 9. At least two of the tropical cyclones were expected to become category 3 severe tropical cyclones, while one was likely to become a category 4 severe tropical cyclone.

Both the Island Climate Update and RSMC Nadi's tropical cyclone outlooks assessed the risk of a tropical cyclone affecting a certain island or territory. Regional sea surface temperatures indicated that the Coral Sea was warmer than normal, but this was not expected to increase the risk of tropical cyclones in the western South Pacific. As a result, it was predicted that the island nations located to the west of the International Date Line, would face a near average risk of being affected by a tropical cyclone. However island nations to the east of the dateline such as Niue and Tonga, faced an increased risk of being affected by a tropical cyclone. It was also noted that cyclones could affect parts of southwest French Polynesia and the southern Cook Islands during an El Niño, while the number of ex tropical cyclones coming to within  of New Zealand was expected to remain about normal. Within the Island Climate Update forecast update it was reported that the Solomon Islands faced an increased risk of tropical cyclones affecting them.

Seasonal summary 

The 2009–10 South Pacific cyclone season was near its climatological average, with eight tropical depressions intensifying into tropical cyclones within the South Pacific to the east of 160°E, while another system became a tropical cyclone after it had left the basin. a warm ENSO episode persisted during the season through April, peaking in late December. The El Niño event slowly decayed due to consistently negative SOI values and weak trade winds in the tropics. The active Madden–Julian oscillation phases generally occurred during periods of increased convective activity in the region, but in March, only a weak pulse traversed the region but at the same time an Equatorial Rossby wave tracked westwards and triggered Cyclone's Tomas and Ului.

Tropical Cyclone Mick was the first tropical disturbance to grace the waters of the South Pacific Ocean during the season. Tropical Cyclone Mick originally developed as a Tropical Disturbance on December 3, and gradually developed before it was named Tropical Cyclone Mick late on December 12. During the next couple of days the disturbance, the system accelerated towards the southeast while gradually intensifying further before peaking on December 14, with 10-minute sustained windspeeds of 110 km/h, (65 mph) and 1-minute winds of 130 km/h, (80 mph). Later that day, Mick made landfall on Viti Levu to the northeast of Nadi and as a result of land interaction, Mick rapidly weakened and became an extratropical depression early the next day. On December 6, Tropical Disturbance 02F developed about 1000 km (620 mi) to the north of Suva, Fiji.

Storms

Tropical Cyclone Mick 

Late on December 3, RSMC Nadi reported that Tropical Disturbance 01F had developed out of a weak area of low pressure to the northeast of Fiji. Over the next few days the disturbance gradually developed before RSMC Nadi reported that it had intensified into a tropical depression late on December 11. During the next day the system intensified further with the JTWC starting to issue warnings declaring it as Tropical Cyclone 04P. Later that day RSMC Nadi reported that Mick had intensified into a category one tropical cyclone and named it as Mick, while it was located about 225 km, (140 mi) to the west of Rotuma. During the next day Tropical Cyclone Mick accelerated towards the southeast while gradually intensifying further, before during December 14, as Mick approached the Fijian island of Viti Levu, the cyclone developed an eye. RSMC Nadi then declared that Mick had peaked with 10 minute windspeeds of 110 km/h, (65 mph) while the JTWC reported that it had peaked with 1 minute winds of 130 km/h, (80 mph). Later that day, Mick made landfall on Viti Levu to the northeast of Nadi. As a result of land interaction, Tropical Cyclone Mick rapidly weakened and became an extratropical depression early the next day. The extratropical remnants of Tropical Cyclone Mick were tracked by RSMC Nadi and TCWC Wellington for another 2 days before they dissipated early on December 18 Just inside TCWC Wellington's area of responsibility.

At least 6 fatalities have been attributed to Mick.

Extratropical Depression 03F 

Early on January 7, RSMC Nadi reported that an extratropical depression had formed about 770 km (480 mi), to the southwest of Papeete in French Polynesia and assigned it the designation of 03F. The depression dissipated on January 10.

Tropical Depression 04F (Olga) 

Tropical Disturbance 04F formed on January 18 and strengthened to a Tropical Depression as it moved south-west through the Solomon Islands. On January 20 it crossed the 160°E meridian into the Australian Basin, where it developed into Tropical Cyclone Olga.

Tropical Depression 05F 

It dissipated on January 28.

Tropical Cyclone Nisha 

RSMC Nadi announced the formation of Tropical Depression 06F on January 27 near 14S 172W. This was only about  NE of the position then being given for 05F and these may have developed from the same system.

Severe Tropical Cyclone Oli 

Tropical Disturbance 07F formed on January 29 near 12S 177E. It was upgraded to a depression late on the 30th. On February 1, the JTWC designated 07F as 12P, and the RSMC upgraded it to Tropical Cyclone Oli. On February 3 it strengthened to become the first Severe Tropical Cyclone since Gene in early 2008.

At least one person was killed by large swells produced by the storm in French Polynesia.

Tropical Depression 08F 

Tropical Depression 08F formed on February 2 near 15S 145W, just south of the King George Islands. However
it dissipated on February 4.

Severe Tropical Cyclone Pat 

On the 7th, the JTWC designated it as Tropical Cyclone 14P, and on the 8th RSMC upgraded it to become Tropical Cyclone Pat. By the 10th it reached Severe Tropical Cyclone strength as it moved towards the southern Cook Islands, and a hurricane warning was then issued for Aitutaki and its neighbours. The eye of the cyclone was reported to have passed right over Aitutaki, with continuous winds estimated locally at 100 knots for 4 hours. There was extensive damage to housing and a hospital, and the Cook Island government declared a State of Disaster.

Severe Tropical Cyclone Rene 

Tropical Depression 10F formed on February 9 near 13S 172W, in the vicinity of Samoa. Late on February 11, RSMC Nadi upgraded the storm to a category 1 cyclone and named it Rene. It continued to strengthen as it moved south of American Samoa, and reached Category 4 on February 14. In American Samoa roads were damaged by landslides caused by the cyclone's heavy rain, and substantial damage was caused to crops. It had weakened to category 3 when it passed through the Vava'u island group of Tonga, and on February 15 the eye was reported to have passed over the Tongan capital Nuku'alofa. The main island of Tongatapu was left without power and water.

Tropical Cyclone Sarah 

RSMC Nadi reported that the disturbance was moving west while the JTWC reported that the disturbance was moving east. Eventually, they both agreed on which direction it was moving and RSMC Nadi upgraded the disturbance to Tropical Depression 11F. It soon weakened, but remained identifiable until February 22 when it was again classified as a Tropical Depression.

Severe Tropical Cyclone Ului 

The next day it was classified as a Tropical Depression. On March 12, 13F was upgraded to Tropical Cyclone Ului. By early on the 13th, it was a category 2 cyclone. Later that day, Ului strengthened into a category 3, making it a severe tropical cyclone. The storm continued to strengthen throughout the day and that night it became a category 5. Ului became the first category 5 South Pacific cyclone since Severe Tropical Cyclone Percy in February 2005. On March 14, Ului exited the Pacific Region and entered the Australian Region.

Severe Tropical Cyclone Tomas 

Shortly after the first advisory on Tropical Disturbance 13F was issued on March 9, the FMS began monitoring a new disturbance, designated 14F, further east. The following day, deep convection began to develop around the disturbance's low-level circulation, prompting the JTWC to begin monitoring it for possible cyclonic development. Later on March 10, the FMS upgraded the system to a tropical depression as it continued to become better organized. Located within an environment characterized by low wind shear, further intensification was anticipated as convection continued to develop over the expanding system. Around 1500 UTC on March 11, the JTWC issued their first advisory on the cyclone, classifying it as Tropical Storm 19P. Several hours later, the FMS upgraded the system to a Category 1 cyclone and gave it the name Tomas. Rapid intensification was expected to take place over the following 48 hours as sea surface temperatures ahead of the storm averaged , well-above the threshold for tropical cyclone development.

Convective banding substantially increased on March 13, allowing Tomas to become the fourth severe tropical cyclone of the season early the next morning. By the afternoon of March 14, Tomas had developed a banding-eye feature surrounded by deep convection. The JTWC also noted further intensification, upgrading Tomas to a Category 3 equivalent storm. Tomas intensified on the night of March 14 and became a Category 4 severe tropical cyclone(according to the Fiji
Meteorological Service) with winds up to 170 km/h and gusts up to 215 km/h blowing roofs off some houses and damaging buildings around the eastern side of Vanua Levu.

Throughout Fiji, Cyclone Tomas wrought widespread damage, killing two people and leaving $83.4 million in losses. One person was killed on Vanua Levu after being swept out to sea by large swells while trying to rescue her two sisters, a niece and a nephew near Namilamila Bay.

Tropical Depression 15F 

During that day the system moved southeastwards before it was designated as Tropical Depression 15F during the next day.

Other systems 
The following weak tropical disturbances and depressions were also monitored by RSMC Nadi, however these systems were either short lived or did not develop significantly. During December 6, Tropical Disturbance 02F developed within a trough of low pressure about 1000 km (620 mi), to the north of Suva, Fiji. Over the next few days, the disturbance moved towards the southeast and remained weak, before it was last noted on December 11 as 01F developed into a tropical depression. Depression 03F, developed on January 7, about 770 km (480 mi) to the southwest of Papeete on the French Polynesian island of Tahiti.

Season effects 
This table lists all the storms that developed in the South Pacific to the east of longitude 160°E during the 2009–2010 season. It includes their intensity on the Australian Tropical cyclone intensity scale, duration, name, landfalls, deaths, and damages. All data is taken from RSMC Nadi and or TCWC Wellington. The Damage figures are all 2010 USD

|-
|  ||  || bgcolor=#| || bgcolor=#| || bgcolor=#| || Fiji ||  || 3 ||
|-
|  ||  || bgcolor=#| || bgcolor=#| || bgcolor=#| || None || None || None ||
|-
|  ||  || bgcolor=#| || bgcolor=#| || bgcolor=#| || French Polynesia, Southern Cook Islands || None || None ||
|-
|  ||  || bgcolor=#| || bgcolor=#| || bgcolor=#| || Solomon Islands || Unknown || 2 ||
|-
|  ||  || bgcolor=#| || bgcolor=#| || bgcolor=#| || None || None || None ||
|-
|  ||  || bgcolor=#| || bgcolor=#| || bgcolor=#| || Samoan Islands, Southern Cook Islands || None || None ||
|-
|  ||  || bgcolor=#| || bgcolor=#| || bgcolor=#| || Samoan Islands, Cook Islands, French Polynesia ||  || 1 ||
|-
|  ||  || bgcolor=#| || bgcolor=#| || bgcolor=| || French Polynesia, Southern Cook Islands || None || None ||
|-
|  ||  || bgcolor=#| || bgcolor=#| || bgcolor=#| || Cook Islands ||  || None ||
|-
|  ||  || bgcolor=#| || bgcolor=#| || bgcolor=#| || Samoan islands, Tonga ||  || None ||
|-
|  ||  || bgcolor=#| || bgcolor=#| || bgcolor=#| || Cook Islands || Unknown || None ||
|-
|  ||  || bgcolor=#| || bgcolor=#| || bgcolor=#| || None || None || None ||
|-
|  ||  || bgcolor=#| || bgcolor=#| || bgcolor=#| || Vanuatu, Solomon Islands || Unknown || 1 ||
|-
|  ||  || bgcolor=#| || bgcolor=#| || bgcolor=#| || Wallis and Futuna, Fiji ||  || 3 ||
|-
|  ||  || bgcolor=#| || bgcolor=#| || bgcolor=#| || None || None || None ||
|-

See also 

 List of Southern Hemisphere cyclone seasons
 Tropical cyclones in 2009 and 2010
 Atlantic hurricane seasons: 2009, 2010
 Pacific hurricane seasons: 2009, 2010
 Pacific typhoon seasons: 2009, 2010
 North Indian Ocean cyclone seasons: 2009, 2010

References

External links 

 
South Pacific cyclone seasons
Articles which contain graphical timelines
2009 Spac
2010 SPac